Cumana, based in Guildford, England, was a manufacturer of computer peripherals including disc drives for Acorn, BBC Micro,  Amiga, and Oric computers.

Cumana entered receivership in 1995, eventually emerging from receivership at the end of 1995 through the acquisition of the company's designs and brand name by Economatics, who did not take on any of the company's liabilities or pre-receivership obligations with regard to orders or guarantees, although the new owner indicated a willingness to honour warranties. Five employees from Cumana joined Economatics in the transaction. Cumana's electronics assembly facilities were acquired by Kenure Developments Ltd (KDL). Cumana was subsequently acquired from Economatics by educational hardware and software supplier Cannon Computing in late 1997.

References

External links
 
 "Cumana - request for information" thread on comp.sys.acorn.networking
 "Cumana RIP?" thread, ibid.
 KDL history

Companies based in Guildford
Defunct companies based in Surrey
Defunct computer companies of the United Kingdom
Defunct computer hardware companies
Science and technology in Surrey